The Hawk's Trail is a 1919 American crime film serial directed by W. S. Van Dyke. It is considered to be a lost film.

Cast
 King Baggot as Sheldon Steele / The Hawk
 Grace Darmond as Claire Drake
 Rhea Mitchell as Jean Drake
 Harry Lorraine as Iron Dugan / Stephen Drake
 Fred Windemere as Bob Dugan
 Stanton Heck as Bull Cruze
 George Siegmann as Quang Goo Hai
 Alfred Hollingsworth
 Carmen Phillips as Mimi
 Nigel De Brulier
 Edna Robinson as Tina Torelli
 Carl Stockdale
 William White (credited as Billy White)
 Arthur Belasco
 Leo White

Chapter titles
False Faces
The Superman
Yellow Shadows
Stained Hands
House of Fear
Room Above
The Bargain
The Phantom Melody
The Lure
The Swoop
One Fatal Step
Tides That Tell
Face to Face
The Substitute
The Showdown

See also
 List of film serials
 List of film serials by studio
 List of lost films

References

External links

1919 films
1919 crime films
1919 lost films
American crime films
American silent serial films
American black-and-white films
1910s English-language films
Films directed by W. S. Van Dyke
Lost American films
Lost crime films
1910s American films